Vialikija Yodkavichy (Belarusian: Вялі́кія Ёдкавічы, Vialikija Jodkavičy; Russian: Великие Ёдковичи; Polish: Jodkiewicze Wielkie) is a village in Belarus, in the Byerastavitsa Raion of Grodno Region.

History 
In the interwar period, the village was situated in Poland, in the Białystok Voivodeship, in the Grodno County, in the Vialikija Ejsmanty Commune. After the Soviet invasion of Poland in 1939, the village became part of the BSSR. In the years 1941-1944 it was under German occupation. Then the village was again in the BSSR. From 1991 in the Republic of Belarus.

In the field in front of the brick chapel, there are the graves of two soldiers of the Polish Army who died in the Polish-Soviet war and the grave of the Home Army soldier Adam Pacenko, who died on July 15, 1944. They were founded in 1989. In June 2022, the tombstones were devastated by unknown perpetrators. The tombstones were removed and the remains of the soldiers dug up.

References

Villages in Belarus